Bertia is the scientific name of two genera of organisms and may refer to:

Bertia (fungus), a genus of fungi in the family Bertiaceae
Bertia (gastropod), a genus of snails in the family Dyakiidae